Hnahthial district is one of the eleven districts of Mizoram state in India. The creation of Hnahthial District was first notified on 12 September 2008 but until 2020, it remained non-functional despite a number of promises made by top political leaders and an all-out effort by Hnahthial District Function Demand Committee to let the state government make it functional. Hnahthial district was made functional only 12 years later on 3 June 2019 with the creation of the office of the Deputy Commissioner.

History

For two decades from 1998 to 2018, the people of Hnahthial demanded for the creation of Hnahthial District through the District Demand Committee later in 2009 renamed as Hnahthial District Function Demand Committee which resorted to various means including Long March from Hnahthial to Aizawl, indefinite fasting, processions, public prayer meetings, Total Bandh, Public Meetings, memorandum and resolutions submitted to the Chief Minister, blockade of NH 54, holding press conferences  and a series of talks held with the Chief Minister of Mizoram.

The Government of Mizoram had ordered creation of office of the Deputy Commissioners of Hnahthial District vide a notification dated 3 June 2019, after which the District started becoming operational and since then Hnahthial has become the headquarters of Hnahthial District. The newly formed Hnahthial District held a grand function on 18 October 2019 at the District Headquarter's HBSC Ground No 1 to celebrate creation of the long-awaited District.

At the initiatives of Hnahthial District Function Demand Committee (HDFDC), the leaders of the District Demand Committees from Hnahthial, Khawlzawl and Saitual held talks with leaders of each political parties on 21 and 22 October 2013 in Aizawl. The main aim was to find out the stand of each party on the implementation of the long delayed three new districts already announced by the then MNF-led government on 12 September 2008. The leaders of Hnahthial District Function Demand Committee who left Hnahthial on 21 September 2013 for Aizawl were listed below:

K.Lalhunmawia,   Secretary, HDFDC
F.Thangluaia, Treasurer, HDFDC
R.Tlangmawia, a member of Executive Committee, HDFDC

The delegates from Hnahthial met with Pu K. Liantlinga, Vice-President of ZNP party at his residence at Venghlui on the evening of 21 September 2013 as the party President Pu Lalduhoma was on a tour to Champhai. The delegates from the three towns had talks on 22 September 2013 first with Pu Lalthanhawla, President of the Congress Party, Mizoram at the Congress Bhavan, then with Pu Zoramthanga, President of MNF at his residence and lastly with some leaders of MPC such as Pu Col. Lalchungnunga Sailo, Senior Vice President; Pu Vanlalhlana, Senior Vice President; Pu Ruatsanga, Gen. Secretary; Pu Dr. Kenneth Chawngliana Ex-speaker & Executive Gen. Secretary; Pu Lalthansanga, MLA; Pu Lalrinzuala, Ex-minister & President, Sub-Headquarters, Lunglei) at the party’s office. One noticeable reaction from the party leaders which was worth to mention here may be the promise in writing by Pu Zoramthanga that he would promptly make the new-born districts functional if they would get majority seats in the state legislature to form the government in the forthcoming MLA elections in 2013.

Toponymy
The district is named after its headquarters Hnahthial.

Divisions

The district has three Legislative Assembly constituencies: South Tuipui, Lunglei North, and Lunglei East. There are twenty seven inhabited towns and villages in the district with 5,846 families comprising 28,468 people. There are 14,208 men and 14,260 women. The district capital has 1,548 families with a population of 7,187.

Towns and villages
The main towns and villages in Hnahthial district are:
Rawpui
Pangzawl
Thiltlang
South Chawngtui
Tarpho
Khawhri
Aithur
Cherhlun
Old Ngharchhip
New Ngharchhip
Thingsai
Bualpui H
South Lungleng
Denlung (Sub-Village)
Leite (with Maudarh Sub-Village)
Rotlang East
Tuipui ‘D’
Darzo
Muallianpui
Lungpuitlang
South Vanlaiphai
Hnahthial
Chhipphir
Bualpui V
Lungmawi
Phaileng South

Transport
A helicopter service by Pawan Hans has been started which connects Aizawl  with Hnahthial. The distance between Hnahthial and Aizawl through NH 54 is 172 km and is connected by a bus and jeep/maxi cab service.

Geography
The district is bounded on the north by Serchhip and on the south by Lawngtlai district, on the southeast by Saiha district, on the east by Myanmar. Hnahthial town is the administrative headquarters of the district.

References

Districts of Mizoram